Rhomboda, commonly known as velvet jewel orchids, is a genus of about twenty species of flowering plants in the orchid family Orchidaceae. Plants in this genus are mostly terrestrial herbs with a fleshy, creeping rhizome and a loose rosette of green to maroon coloured leaves. Small resupinate or partly resupinate, dull coloured flowers are borne on a hairy flowering stem. The dorsal sepal and petals overlap and form a hood over the column and there is a deep pouch at the base of the labellum. They are found in tropical regions from northern India through Southeast Asia, China, Japan to Australia and some Pacific Islands.

Description
Orchids in the genus Rhomboda are usually terrestrial, perennial, deciduous, sympodial herbs with a creeping, fleshy, above-ground rhizome anchored to the ground by wiry roots. A few species are epiphytic. The leaves are spirally arranged around the stem with the upper leaves forming a loose rosette. They are dark green to maroon or brownish with a central white or red line. The flowers are resupinate or partly resupinate with the dorsal sepal and petals fused to form a hood over the column. The lateral sepals are similar to the dorsal sepal, free and often spreading. The labellum has a deep pouch near its base, a narrow middle section and often has a hooked tip.

Taxonomy and naming
The genus Rhomboda was first formally described in 1857 by John Lindley and the description was published in Journal of the Linnean Society, Botany. The name Rhomboda is derived from the Ancient Greek word rhombos meaning "a top", referring to the shape of the calli on the labellum of the type specimen.

Distribution
Orchids in the genus Rhomboda are native to Nepal, India, Sri Lanka, Bhutan, China, Myanmar, Thailand, Laos, Cambodia, Vietnam, Japan, the Philippines, New Guinea, New Caledonia, the Solomon Islands, Vanuatu and Queensland between the Daintree and Paluma.

Species list
The following is a list of species accepted by the World Checklist of Selected Plant Families as at August 2018:

Rhomboda abbreviata (Lindl.) Ormerod - Guangdong, Guangxi, Guizhou, Hainan, Assam, Myanmar, Nepal, Thailand
Rhomboda alticola (Schltr.) Ormerod - New Guinea
Rhomboda arunachalensis A.N.Rao - Arunachal Pradesh
Rhomboda atrorubens (Schltr.) Ormerod - New Guinea, Bismarck Archipelago
Rhomboda bantaengensis (J.J.Sm.) Ormerod - Sulawesi
Rhomboda blackii (Ames) Ormerod - Mindanao
Rhomboda cristata (Blume) Ormerod - Java, Philippines
Rhomboda dennisii Ormerod - Vanuatu, Solomon Islands
Rhomboda elbertii Ormerod - Sulawesi
Rhomboda fanjingensis Ormerod - Guizhou
Rhomboda kerintjiensis (J.J.Sm.) Ormerod - Sumatra
Rhomboda lanceolata (Lindl.) Ormerod - Darjiling, Bhutan, Assam, Arunachal Pradesh, Myanmar, Vietnam, Peninsular Malaysia, Philippines, Sulawesi, Sumatra, New Guinea, Kyushu
Rhomboda longifolia Lindl. - Sikkim
Rhomboda minahassae (Schltr.) Ormerod - Sulawesi
Rhomboda moulmeinensis (C.S.P.Parish & Rchb.f.) Ormerod - Guangxi, Guizhou, Sichuan, Tibet, Yunnan, Myanmar, Thailand
Rhomboda pauciflora (Ridl.) Ormerod - Vietnam, Peninsular Malaysia, Sabah
Rhomboda petelottii (Gagnep.) Ormerod - Vietnam
Rhomboda polygonoides (F.Muell.) Ormerod - Queensland, New Guinea, Maluku, Solomon Islands, Bismarck Archipelago, New Caledonia
Rhomboda pulchra (King & Pantl.) Ormerod & Av.Bhattacharjee 
Rhomboda tokioi (Fukuy.) Ormerod - Guangdong, Taiwan, Japan, Ryukyu Islands, Vietnam
Rhomboda velutina (J.J.Sm.) Ormerod - Java, Lesser Sunda Islands
Rhomboda wardii Ormerod - Myanmar
Rhomboda yakusimensis (Masam.) Ormerod - Ryukyu Islands, Izu Islands, Kyushu

References

 
Orchids of Queensland
Orchids of Asia
Orchids of China
Orchids of Japan
Orchids of New Guinea
Orchids of New Caledonia
Orchids of Laos
Orchids of the Solomon Islands
Orchids of Thailand
Orchids of Vanuatu
Cranichideae genera